Operation Chamber was a military raid launched by the Rhodesian Security Forces (RSF) against a camp belonging to the communist insurgent group, ZANLA. The cadres camp was located in Chinvinge, Tete Province, Mozambique. During the course of the operation three troopers were killed, Corporal P O Rice, Trooper C.F Lang and Lance Corporal E Nel were killed.

In the aftermath of the raid on the 9th of June Operation Mineral was launched by the SAS, which took place in Manica Province.

References

Bibliography

1979 in Rhodesia
Chamber